The Indiana Theory Review is a peer-reviewed academic journal specializing in music theory and analysis. It began publication in 1977, under the auspices of graduate students in music theory at the Jacobs School of Music, making it the second of the graduate-student produced theory journals to debut in the United States (after In Theory Only). Originally edited and managed wholly by graduate students, the journal more recently formed an editorial board of senior scholars in the field. The journal has published continuously since its inception and is currently (2018) in volume 34. The journal is published on the Public Knowledge Project's Open Journal Systems platform and all issues before the current one are available on JSTOR.

References

External links
 

Music theory journals
Contemporary classical music journals
English-language journals
Publications established in 1977
Indiana University